Blame the Messenger is the fifth studio album by experimental singer-songwriter David Thomas, released in January 1987 by Rough Trade and Twin/Tone Records. In 1997, the album was remastered by Paul Hamann and David Thomas for its inclusion in the Monster anthology box set.

Track listing

Personnel
Adapted from the Monster Walks the Winter Lake liner notes.

The Wooden Birds
 Chris Cutler – drums, production
 Jim Jones – electric guitar, acoustic guitar, backing vocals
 Tony Maimone – electric bass guitar, acoustic bass guitar, backing vocals
 Allen Ravenstine – EML synthesizer, piano, backing vocals
 David Thomas – lead vocals, accordion

Production and additional personnel
 Michael Bishop – mastering
 Paul Hamann – engineering
 Mik Mellen – cover art
 John Thompson – design

Release history

References

External links 
 

David Thomas (musician) albums
1987 albums
Rough Trade Records albums
Twin/Tone Records albums